The 1987 Virginia Slims of Oklahoma was a women's tennis tournament played on indoor hard courts in Oklahoma City, Oklahoma in the United States and was part of the Category 1+ tier of the 1987 Virginia Slims World Championship Series. It was the second edition of the tournament and ran from February 9 through February 15, 1987. Fourth-seeded Elizabeth Smylie won the singles title.

Finals

Singles
 Elizabeth Smylie defeated  Lori McNeil 4–6, 6–3, 7–5
 It was Smylie's 1st singles title of the year and the 3rd of her career.

Doubles
 Svetlana Parkhomenko /  Larisa Savchenko defeated  Lori McNeil /  Kim Sands 6–4, 6–4
 It was Novotná's 1st title of the year and the 4th of her career. It was Suire's 1st title of the year and the 4th of her career.

References

External links
 ITF tournament edition details
 Tournament draws

Virginia Slims of Oklahoma
U.S. National Indoor Championships
Virginia Slims of Oklahoma
Virginia Slims of Oklahoma
Virginia Slims of Oklahoma